The 1980–81 OB I bajnokság season was the 44th season of the OB I bajnokság, the top level of ice hockey in Hungary. Three teams participated in the league, and Alba Volan Szekesfehervar won the championship.

Regular season

External links
 Spielzeit bei hockeyarchives.info

Hun
OB I bajnoksag seasons
OB